Anachis jungi is a species of sea snail in the family Columbellidae, the dove snails.

References

jungi
Gastropods described in 2004